Cheirolepidiaceae (also spelled Cheirolepidaceae) is an extinct family of conifers. They first appeared in the Triassic, and were widespread during most of the Mesozoic era. They are united by the possession of a distinctive pollen type assigned to the form genus Classopollis. The name Frenelopsidaceae (as a separate family) or "frenelopsids" has been used for a group of Cheirolepidiaceae with jointed stems, thick internode cuticles, sheathing leaf bases and reduced free leaf tips. The leaf morphology has been noted as being similar to that of halophyte Salicornia. Several members of the family appear to have been adapted for semi-arid and coastal settings, with a high tolerance of saline conditions. Cheirolepidiaceae disappeared from most regions of the world during the Cenomanian-Turonian stages of the Late Cretaceous, but reappeared in South America during the Maastrichtian, the final stage of the Cretaceous, increasing in abundance after the K-Pg extinction and being a prominent part of the regional fauna during the Paleocene, before going extinct.

The habit of cheirolepidaceous confers is likely to have varied widely, from large trees to shrubs.

The relationships of Cheirolepidiaceae to other conifers are uncertain. A close relationship with Araucariaceae and Podocarpaceae has been proposed, based on the similarities of their reproductive structures.

At least some species of Cheirolepidiaceae have been suggested to have been pollinated by insects, due to the construction of the reproductive organs and the fact that insects have been found associated with Classopolis pollen grains.

The family name Hirmeriellaceae is a junior synonym of Cheirolepidiaceae. Some authors have suggested Hirmeriellaceae is the valid name for the family, due to nomenclatural issues with the original Cheirolepis genus, which is a junior homonym of a member of Asteraceae, with Cheirolepidium being an invalid replacement, with both likely being synonyms of Hirmeriella.

References 

Pinales families
Mesozoic plants